Rich Valley Township may refer to the following townships in the United States:

 Rich Valley Township, McLeod County, Minnesota
 Rich Valley Township, Benson County, North Dakota